The Aux Pékans River is a river in the Côte-Nord region of Quebec, Canada.
It is a tributary of the Moisie River.
Hydro-Québec caused controversy in the early 1990s by proposing to divert the river to supply the reservoir of the SM-3 power plant on the Sainte-Marguerite River.

Location

The Aux Pékans River is in the unorganized territory of Rivière-Mouchalagane in the Caniapiscau Regional County Municipality.
The name was made official on 5 December 1968.
The Commission de toponymie du Québec has no information on its origins.

The river rises in Lac de la Bouteille, south of Lake Germaine and west of Fermont.
It flows to the west of the Mont Wright mines.
Quebec Route 389 crosses the Pékans River south of Fermont.
In August 2015 a limit of 10 tonnes was placed on vehicles crossing the bridge. 
The Ministry of Transport was working on a replacement structure, due to be commissioned in summer 2016.

The river flows in a generally SSE direction, then near its end turns to the NE and enters the Moise River from the right.
The proposed Moisie River Aquatic Reserve would include  of the Aux Pékans River.

Tributaries
Tributaries of the Aux Pékans River include the Grasse River, which enters the right bank from the south, the Carheil River, which enters the left bank from the north and the La Ronde River, which enters the right bank from the south.
The lake is south of Fermont and of Quebec Route 389.

Environment

A map of the Ecological regions of Quebec shows the Aux Pékans River rising to the northwest of Fermont just west of the Spruce/lichen domain of the boreal zone.
It flows to its juncture with the Moisie through the eastern spruce/moss domain of the boreal zone.

Diversion proposal

At the start of the 1990s Hydro-Québec announced plans to harness the Sainte-Marguerite River with a new SM-3 hydroelectric project, which would produce 846 MW of electricity. 
The project would involve the diversion of the Carheil and Aux Pekans rivers, two important tributaries of the Mishtashipu, or Moisie.
The Innu people of Mani-Utenam at the mouth of the Moisie were concerned about the increase in methylmercury and decrease in the flow of the Moise, and the effect on the 12,000–35,000 salmon that entered the river annually.
However, the Innuat of Uashat to the west in Sept-Îles tended to favor the project.

A report published in 1994 discussed the impact of diverting the Aux Pékans and Carheil rivers for the SM-3 plant.
As well as changing the hydrological regime, water temperature would be affected, an important factor in the habitat quality for Atlantic salmon.
The report found that the Moise River would become slightly warmer, with less change further downstream.
An earlier study has also estimated the impact if some of the diverted water was returned to the Moisie further down.

Calculations were made of the effect on the Moisie estuary if one of the embankments on the Carheil and Aux Pekans were to fail.

A commission of the Bureau of Public Hearings on the environment concluded that the diversion was  not economically justified and could adversely affect the salmon population in the Moisie.
In the end the government decided in favor of protecting the two tributaries. 
On 6 February 2003 the Quebec Council of Ministers approved two decrees granting full legal protection as aquatic reserves to the watersheds of the Moisie River down to 25 kilometers from Sept-Îles, and the Ashuapmushuan River down to Lac-Saint-Jean.
The Moisie reserve included protection for the Carheil and Aux Pékans, which were not to be diverted.

Notes

Citations

Sources

Rivers of Côte-Nord